Biography

Nathaniel Oyet Peri is a South Sudanese politician. He is the deputy leader of the Sudan People's Liberation Movement-in-Opposition, and has been deputy speaker of the National Legislative Assembly since 2021.

Education Background

Appointment 
Nathaniel Oyet was appointed as the first deputy speaker of the 550 strong number parliament after the dissolution of the parliament in the 2018 peace deal in May.

Nathaniel Oyet was also appointed by deputy chairman of the SPLM-IO known as South Sudan's people`s Liberation movement-In Opposition by Dr.Riek Machar in South Sudan, Nathaniel Oyet is a member of the opposition in the side of the SPLM-IO that was created in 2013 from the Government side SPLM-IG.

References 

Living people
Year of birth missing (living people)
Legislative deputy speakers

Sudan People's Liberation Movement politicians